The 2016 South Florida Bulls football team represented the University of South Florida (USF) in the 2016 NCAA Division I FBS football season. The 2016 season is the 20th season for the Bulls, and their fourth as a member of the American Athletic Conference (The American). They played their home games at Raymond James Stadium in Tampa, Florida, and were led during the regular season by head coach Willie Taggart, who was in his fourth year. Following the regular season, but before the team's appearance in the Birmingham Bowl, Taggart left to take the head coaching vacancy at Oregon, with co-offensive coordinator T. J. Weist named as interim head coach for the bowl game.

Even though South Florida had been ranked as high as #2 in 2007, this was their first season finishing the season ranked; even though they were ranked in the 2008 pre-season poll.

Schedule

Source:

Game summaries

Towson

Northern Illinois

at Syracuse

Florida State

at Cincinnati

East Carolina

UConn

at Temple

Navy

at Memphis

at SMU

UCF

South Carolina–Birmingham Bowl

Rankings

References

South Florida
South Florida Bulls football seasons
Birmingham Bowl champion seasons
South Florida Bulls football